The Boucles de Seine Saint-Denis was a one-day road cycling race held only in 1998 in France as part of the French Road Cycling Cup.

Result

References

UCI Europe Tour races
1998 establishments in France
Cycle races in France
1998 disestablishments in France
Defunct cycling races in France